Max Joseph Roemer (1791–1849) was a German botanist who worked in Weimar.

Roemer served as Landrichter (country judge) in the Bavarian town of Aub before working as a private scientist in Würzburg. and is the taxonomic authority of the genera Heteromeles, Pyracantha, and Erythrocarpus as well as numerous plant species.

Publications

References

German naturalists
1791 births
1849 deaths